Peggy Ann Clifford (23 March 1921 in Poole, Dorset – 26 May 1986, in Kensington), was an English film, stage, and television character actress. She was born Peggy Anne Hamley Champion. Her mother's maiden name was Clifford.

She appeared in two of the forty-seven episodes of 'The Children's Television Caravan', (1956-'60), under her own name.
Her stage appearances,  although fewer than her films, included rep, in the West End, and the original Royal Court production of John Arden's Live Like Pigs in 1958.

Selected filmography

 One Exciting Night (1944) - Bessie (uncredited)
 The History of Mr. Polly (1949) - Mother (uncredited)
 Forbidden (1949) - Millie
 Kind Hearts and Coronets (1949) - Maud Redpole
 The Chiltern Hundreds (1949) - Mother
 Chance of a Lifetime (1950) - Worker
 I Believe in You (1952) - Mrs. Tyson (uncredited)
 The Yellow Balloon (1953) - Cafe Owner (uncredited)
 Personal Affair (1953) - 3rd Gossip (uncredited)
 A Day to Remember (1953) - Large Lady in Station Crowd (uncredited)
 The Million Pound Note (1954) - Assistant Matron (uncredited)
 Value for Money (1955) - Fat Mother (uncredited)
 Josephine and Men (1955) - Landlady
 Man of the Moment (1955) - Second Chambermaid (uncredited)
 The Time of His Life (1955) - Cook
 It's a Great Day (1955) - Pub Landlady (uncredited)
 The Man who Stroked Cats (1955) - Herself - (Dir. by Anthony Pelissier with Tony Britton (short)
 Lost (1956) - Shop Keeper (uncredited)
 My Wife's Family (1956) - (uncredited)
 The Secret Place (1957) - Mrs. Wilson's Neighbour (uncredited)
 Brothers in Law (1957) - Mrs. Bristow
 Doctor at Large (1957) - Matron (uncredited)
 Stranger in Town (1957) - Mrs. Woodham
 Just My Luck (1957) - Lady on Tube (uncredited)
 The One That Got Away (1957) -Railway Porter (uncredited)
 Happy Is the Bride (1958) - Bella
 Grip of the Strangler (1958) - Kate
 The Captain's Table (1959) - Alice in Photograph (uncredited)
 Follow a Star (1959) - Offended Lady at Party (uncredited)
 On the Beat (1962) - Giulio's Mother 
 Sparrows Can't Sing (1963) - Ted's Wife
 Heavens Above! (1963) - Bit Part, Crowd Scene (uncredited)
 Carry On Cleo (1964) - Willa Claudia (uncredited)
 Two Left Feet (1965) - Customer (uncredited)
 Cuckoo Patrol (1967) - Girl Guide Leader 
 Far from the Madding Crowd (1967) - Fat Lady at Circus 
 Futtocks End (1970) - The Cook
 Sex and the Other Woman (1972) - Wife 
 Under Milk Wood (1972) - Bessie Bighead
 Voices (1973) - The Medium
 Jabberwocky (1977) - Merchants' Nurse (uncredited)
 Murder by Decree (1979) - Lees' Housekeeper
 Are You Being Served? (1979) - Customer (nr. 7 - Agent)

References

External links 

1921 births
1986 deaths
English television actresses
English film actresses
English stage actresses
People from Poole
20th-century English actresses
Actresses from Dorset